The Maidstone trolleybus system once served Maidstone, the county town of Kent, England.

By the standards of the various now defunct trolleybus systems in the United Kingdom, the Maidstone system was a small one, with just two routes, and a maximum fleet of only 24 trolleybuses.

Three of the former Maidstone trolleybuses are now preserved, two of them at the Trolleybus Museum at Sandtoft, Lincolnshire, and the other at the East Anglia Transport Museum, Carlton Colville, Suffolk.

See also

 History of Maidstone
 List of trolleybus systems in the United Kingdom

References

Further reading

External links 

 SCT'61 website Photos and descriptions of Maidstone Corporation trolleybuses and early motorbuses
 Maidstone Corporation Trolleybus historical site, including route map
 National Trolleybus Archive
 British Trolleybus Society, based in Reading
 National Trolleybus Association, based in London

Maidstone

Maidstone
Maidstone